The Haufe Dale Hawk 2 is an American high-wing, strut-braced, single-seat glider that was designed and built by Walter Haufe and Leland Hanselman.

Design and development
The Dale Hawk 2 was named for Hanselman's home town of Dale, Wisconsin.

The aircraft was designed and built in 1939 and is constructed  from wood, with doped aircraft fabric covering. The two-spar wing is braced with "V" struts and employs a U.S.A. 35A airfoil. The wing has no spoilers or other glidepath control devices.

Operational history
In 1940 Haufe completed a nine-hour and fifty-minute flight over High Cliff near Neenah, Wisconsin flying the Dale Hawk 2.

Once the United States entered the Second World War at the end of 1941, the aircraft was put in storage, where it suffered some damage. It was purchased by C. M. Van Airsdale in 1954 and  restored by him with the assistance of Hanselman, Harry Edwards and C. Vogt. In 1969 Van Airsdale donated it to the EAA AirVenture Museum.

Aircraft on display
EAA AirVenture Museum - sole example

Specifications (Dale Hawk 2)

See also

References

External links
Photo of the Dale Hawk 2
Photo of the Dale Hawk 2

1930s United States sailplanes
Homebuilt aircraft
Aircraft first flown in 1939